The following is a list of clubs who have played in the Philippines Football League since its inception in 2017.

Over the five years and four seasons of the league, fifteen teams have played or will play in the league, 4 clubs based in the Visayas region, 1 based in Mindanao, and the rest in Luzon. 11 teams at one point or another were based within Metro Manila, while one club (Philippine Air Force) has no designated home stadium. Following the league's franchise requirements, most teams applying for a provisional license must forge a partnership with their home city. Mendiola 1991, after obtaining an AFC license, currently have Imus, Cavite as their home province while their stadium is under construction in Taytay, Rizal. Likewise, United City are temporarily based in Capas, Tarlac while their stadium is under construction in Pampanga.

Of the original 8 founding members, only three clubs are still participating in the league: United City, Kaya–Iloilo, and Stallion Laguna. One club, formerly known as Meralco Manila and presently known as Loyola, plans to join the league in the 2022 season. Three of the clubs have not yet participated in a full-length league season, having first participated in either the shortened 2020 season or in the subsequent editions of the Copa Paulino Alcantara. One team, namely the Azkals Development Team, is a guest team as well as a developmental team but treats itself as a professional club and a permanent member of the league. Of the fifteen teams, two clubs are named after sponsors (Ceres–Negros and Dynamic Herb Cebu).

Aside from Loyola, there have been other multiple changes of names and localities since the league started in 2017. Kaya, now based in Iloilo, was known as Kaya–Makati until relocating in early 2018. Davao Aguilas changed their name to Davao Aguilas Bellmare following the club's partnership with Shonan Bellmare of Japan. The now-defunct Global  was once based in Cebu and was known as Global Cebu, then relocated to Makati and renamed themselves to Global Makati, then before the blacklisting of the club in mid-2020, they renamed to "Global" without the locality in the club name. The most notable example is United City, who were formerly known as Ceres–Negros until 2020, when the club folded and was taken over by MMC Sportz Asia, relocating from Bacolod to Capas.

Table
All statistics refer to the clubs' participation in the PFL only, not counting their records in the Copa Paulino Alcantara. For the top scorer section, players whose names are marked in bold still play for the club they scored the most goals for. Clubs whose names are in bold are current members while clubs in italics were founding members.

Overview of clubs by season

Notes

References

Philippines Football League clubs